"I Love" is a song written and recorded by American country music artist Tom T. Hall. It was released in October 1973 as the only single from the album For the People in the Last Hard Town. The song would be Hall's most successful single and was his fourth number one on the US country singles chart, spending two weeks at the top and a total of 15 weeks on the chart. Additionally, "I Love" was Hall's sole entry on the Top 40, peaking at number 12.

Covers and alternative versions 
Addressing potential censorship issues, an alternative version of Hall's recording replaced the lyrics "bourbon in a glass and grass" with "old TV shows and snow".
"I Love" was used, with altered lyrics, in a popular 2003 TV commercial for Coors Light, which prominently featured the Klimaszewski Twins.

Soundtrack appearances 
The song was used in the film For No Good Reason.

Chart performance

Weekly charts

Year-end charts

References

External links
 

1973 singles
Tom T. Hall songs
Songs written by Tom T. Hall
Song recordings produced by Jerry Kennedy
Mercury Records singles